Alexander Stuart may refer to:

Alexander Stuart (scientist) (1673–1742), scientist, winner of the Copley Medal
Alexander Hugh Holmes Stuart (1807–1891), United States Secretary of the Interior between 1850 and 1853
Alexander Stuart (Australian politician) (1824–1886), Premier of New South Wales, Australia between 1883 and 1885
Alex Stuart (footballer) (born 1940), Scottish former footballer
Alexander Stuart (writer), author and screenwriter of The War Zone
Alexander Stuart (Canadian politician) (1857–1928), Ontario farmer and political figure
Alexander Stuart (New Zealand politician) (c1875–1954), New Zealand politician
Alexander C. Stuart (1831–1898), British-American naval painter
Alexander Stuart, 5th Lord Blantyre (died 1704), Scottish nobleman, soldier and politician
Alexander Stuart, 5th Earl of Moray (1634–1701), Scottish nobleman
Alexander Moody Stuart (1809–1898), minister of the Free Church of Scotland
Alexander Mackenzie Stuart, Baron Mackenzie-Stuart (1924–2000), Scottish advocate and judge
Alexander Stuart (priest), Anglican priest in Ireland in the 19th-century

See also
Alex Stuart (disambiguation)
Alexander Stewart (disambiguation)
Alex Stewart (disambiguation)